The following is a list of events affecting radio broadcasting in 2012. Events listed include radio program debuts, finales, cancellations, and station launches, closures and format changes, as well as information about controversies and deaths of radio personalities.

Notable events

January

February

March

April

May

June

July

August

September

October

November

December

Debuts

Endings

Deaths

References

2012 in radio
Radio by year
Mass media timelines by year